George Marsden Waterhouse (6 April 1824 – 6 August 1906) was a Premier of South Australia from  8 October 1861 until 3 July 1863 and the seventh premier of New Zealand from 11 October 1872 to 3 March 1873.

Early life
George Waterhouse's father, Rev John Waterhouse, was general superintendent of the Wesleyan Missions in Australia and Polynesia.

Australia 
Waterhouse was aged 15 when his family migrated in 1839, initially to Hobart. Four years later he moved to Adelaide and set up business as a merchant.

He was first elected to parliament in the electoral district of East Torrens in the colony of South Australia in August 1851. He resigned 3 years later, was elected again in 1857 but resigned again soon after. 

He supported economic development of the colony through free trade and was elected to the South Australian Legislative Council again in 1860, where he advocated uniform tariffs for Australia. He was chief secretary in the First Reynolds Ministry from May 1860 to February 1861. After Reynolds ended his term as Premier in 1861, Waterhouse formed a government with the intention of finalising a motion in relation to Justice Benjamin Boothby, a judge in the Supreme Court of South Australia who was causing difficulties by objecting to the legitimacy of the Appeals Court under the new Constitution. Waterhouse resigned his ministry after this task was completed, but was persuaded to reform another government, which lasted until July 1863 before collapsing in the face of accusations of financial irregularities and alleged misappropriation of funds. In 1864 he retired from South Australian politics and spent some time in England.

New Zealand 
Waterhouse migrated to New Zealand in 1869 and on 13 May 1870 was appointed to the New Zealand Legislative Council. He was in the Fox Ministry from 30 October to 20 November 1871, and in October 1872 became premier without portfolio. He resigned in March 1873 finding that as a member of the upper house it was impossible to keep control of his ministry. He remained a Legislative Council member until his resignation on 30 June 1890.

Retirement in England 
Waterhouse fell into ill-health and retired to England in 1889, and died at Torquay, Devonshire on 6 August 1906.

Waterhouse had his career both in Australia and New Zealand, but it was much hampered by the poor state of his health. He has the unusual distinction of having been the premier of two colonies. Despite this distinction, Waterhouse never received a knighthood or a peerage for his services in governing two colonies.

Personal
He married Lydia Giles (1827 – 25 January 1910), a daughter of William Giles, on 5 July 1848. Fanny, one of their two adopted daughters, married William Fitzherbert in 1875.

References

External links

New Zealand Prime Ministers

|-

|-

|-

|-

|-

|-

|-

|-

|-

Prime Ministers of New Zealand
Premiers of South Australia
People from Penzance
Australian people of Cornish descent
British emigrants to Australia
British emigrants to New Zealand
New Zealand people of Cornish descent
1824 births
1906 deaths
Speakers of the New Zealand Legislative Council
Members of the New Zealand Legislative Council
Cornish Methodists
19th-century Australian politicians
19th-century New Zealand politicians
19th-century Methodists
Members of the South Australian House of Assembly
Members of the South Australian Legislative Council